, also known by its English name Talk of the Town, is a compilation album by Japanese musician Ringo Sheena. It was released on her 15th anniversary on November 13, 2013 by Universal Music Japan sublabel EMI Records Japan, alongside a live recording compilation album called Mitsugetsu-shō. The album compiles her collaborations with other musicians not released on a Ringo Sheena album, as well as two unpublished songs.

Background and development 

Ukina was released as a part of Ringo Sheena's 15th anniversary celebrations. Sheena previously celebrated her 5th and 10th anniversaries: for her 5th anniversary in 2003, she held the Sugoroku Ecstasy tour and released her "Ringo no Uta" single. For her 10th in 2008, she released the B-side compilation album Watashi to Hōden, performed the Ringo Expo 08 series of concerts and released the Mora album box set.

Ukina was released alongside Mitsugetsu-shō, an album compiling songs from different live concerts. Also released on that on November 13 were The Sexual Healing Total Care Course 120min. and Live, two box sets compiling all of her visual media. Many of her previous live DVDs were also re-released on Blu-ray on the same day: Gekokujō Xstasy (2000), Hatsuiku Status: Gokiritsu Japon (2000), Baishō Ecstasy (2003), Electric Mole (2003), Zazen Extasy (2008) and Ringo Expo 08 (2009).

Writing and production 

The songs "Becoming" and "Rock & Hammer" were originally on Takashi Taniguchi's 1998 album Becoming. "Rockin' Luuula" was a song from Mo'some Tonebender's album Rockin' Luuula (2005), in which Sheena sung chorus and played the piano. Sheena also performed the kazoo on the song , also featured on Rockin' Luuula. For Blankey Jet City vocalist Kenichi Asai's 2006 debut single "Kiken Sugiru," Sheena performed chorus work. It was later featured on his album Johnny Hell (2006).

"Amai Yamai" was collaboration with hip-hop group Maboroshi on their 2009 album Maboroshi no Shi. Two versions of Sheena's collaboration with Soil & "Pimp" Sessions, "My Foolish Heart," are featured on Ukina. The "Crazy on Earth" version was featured on their album 6 (2009), and the "Crazy in Shibuya" version was released as a digital download on September 30, 2009. "Kirakira Bushi" was a 2011 pseudonymous collaboration with Takafumi Ikeda's solo-project Rekishi, using the name Deyonna.

Many of the other collaborations were from 2013. "Koroshiya Kiki Ippatsu" was another collaboration with Soil & "Pimp" Sessions, which was released as a single, reaching number 14 on Oricon single charts. It featured on their album Circles. Further collaborations included "Apple" on Towa Tei's Lucky (2013) and "Yasashii Tetsugaku" on Tomita Lab's album Joyous. Sheena was also featured as a vocalist on two other songs from Lucky:  which also featured Yuko Hara, Ken Yokoyama, and Yu Sakai, and the leading promotional track , which also featuredYuko Hara, Ken Yokoyama, and Yu Sakai.

"Between Today and Tomorrow" is an instrumental track Sheena wrote for the film Kyō to Ashita no Aida ni, a documentary on ballet artist Yasuyuki Shuto. She worked on the track with Neko Saito and his quartet. It was released as a digital single on January 7, 2012.

Two previously unreleased songs were featured on the album. "It Was You" was a ballad written by Burt Bacharach. It was first performed at the Rising Sun Rock Festival in Otaru, Hokkaido on August 16, 2008, but otherwise was unreleased. Sheena performed the song together with the Neko Saito Quartet, and they are credited as the collaborating artist on Ukina. "Netsuai Hakkakuchū" was a song Sheena wrote especially for Ukina, which she asked electronic musician Yasutaka Nakata to arrange for her.

Promotion and release 

A music video was released for "It Was You" on November 1, 2013, featuring Sheena performing the song with the Neko Saito Quartet.

A music video for "Netsuai Hakkakuchū" was also produced for the album. A short version which was uploaded in early November reached 100,000 views in three days. The full version was released in full on November 13, 2013. Linnko wears a black leather mini-dress while she attacks the men. The video also features dance scenes with both Rinnko and Linnko, alongside dance crew Idevian Crew. It was Sheena's first time attempting dance and action scenes.

On November 13, both "Netsuai Hakkakuchū" and "It Was You" were released on iTunes as digital singles, instead of the entire album being released. "Netsuai Hakkakuchū" was given the French title "J'ai trouvé l'amour" (meaning "I Have Found Love" in English). On November 15, Sheena performed "Netsuai Hakkakuchū" live at Music Station. The song peaked at number 18 on the Billboard Japan Hot 100 chart after the album's release.

Several days after the album's release, Sheena held a series of concerts at the Orchard Hall in Tokyo called  on November 18, 19, 20, 25 and 26. Two additional concerts for Sheena's fanclub called  were held on November 28 and 29 at the Hamarikyu Asahi Hall in Tokyo. The November 29 concert was broadcast simultaneously on website Livespire, as well as at 80 movie theaters across Japan.

Chart reception 

The album debuted at number 5 on Oricon's albums chart, selling 21,000 copies. After charting in the top 300 for eight weeks, the album sold a total of 35,000 copies. In Taiwan, where the album was re-titled Yùnshì (韻事, "Affair"), it reached number 10 on the East Asian subchart of G-Music in December.

Critical reception 

Critical reception was positive for Ukina. Both CDJournal reviewers and Sayako Oki from Skream! felt Sheena's presence was felt strongly in the songs for Ukina. CDJournal praised "Netsuai Hakkakuchū," feeling that it "resonated now" and that it "took the leadership." Oki believed that even though the songs were originally from different projects, the order that Sheena had created made them work well as a cohesive album.

Track listing

Chart rankings

Charts

Sales and certifications

Year-end charts

Release history

References 

2013 compilation albums
Ringo Sheena albums
Japanese-language albums